Derviş Eroğlu (born 7 March 1938) is a Turkish Cypriot politician, who served as the president of Northern Cyprus from 2010 to 2015. Previously, he was Prime Minister from 1985 to 1994, 1996 to 2004 and again from 2009 to 2010 and twice-leader of the National Unity Party.

He served a term as Prime Minister of nearly 17 years, by this he was the longest serving Prime Minister of the country. He also holds the record of longest serving MP.

Early life and education
Eroğlu was born in Famagusta in 1938. He studied medicine at Istanbul University, graduating in 1963. He later specialised in urology.

Politics

Eroğlu entered the Assembly of the Republic of the then-Turkish Federated State of Northern Cyprus in 1976, serving as Minister of Education, Culture, Youth and Sports during 1976–77. He served as member of the de facto Northern Cyprus (TRNC) Constituent Assembly in November 1983. As the leader of the National Unity Party (UBP), he was appointed Prime Minister in four successive governments between 1985 and 1993 (he was opposition leader between 1994 and 1996), and from 1996 until his party lost the general election to the Republican Turkish Party under Mehmet Ali Talat in 2004. Eroğlu's UBP won the majority of seats in the legislative election of 18 April 2009, and Eroğlu became Prime Minister again.

On 21 November 2005, Eroğlu resigned as leader of the UBP, stating that "it was time for younger blood to take control", but was re-elected to the chair in November 2008. Eroğlu was elected to the office of President of Northern Cyprus on 18 April 2010.  Because the UN does not recognize the TRNC, it regards Derviş Eroğlu as bona fide negotiator for the Turkish Cypriot community of the Republic of Cyprus.

In the 2015 general elections, he was defeated by Mustafa Akıncı.

References

External links

|-

|-

|-

1938 births
21st-century presidents of Northern Cyprus
20th-century prime ministers of Northern Cyprus
21st-century prime ministers of Northern Cyprus
Istanbul University Faculty of Medicine alumni
Living people
Members of the Assembly of the Republic (Northern Cyprus)
National Unity Party (Northern Cyprus) politicians
People from Famagusta
Presidents of Northern Cyprus
Prime Ministers of Northern Cyprus
Cypriot urologists
Turkish Cypriot expatriates in Turkey